is a Japanese football player. He plays for Gamba Osaka.

Career
Yusuke Kishida joined J1 League club Gamba Osaka in 2017.

Career statistics

Reserves performance

Last Updated: 9 December 2017

References

External links

1999 births
Living people
Association football people from Nara Prefecture
Japanese footballers
J1 League players
Gamba Osaka players
Association football defenders